Post-behavioralism (or post-behaviouralism) also known as neo-behavioralism (or neo-behaviouralism) was a reaction against the dominance of behavioralist methods in the study of politics. One of the key figures in post-behaviouralist thinking was David Easton who was originally one of the leading advocates of the "behavioral revolution". Post-behavioralists claimed that despite the alleged value-neutrality of behavioralist research it was biased towards the status quo and social preservation rather than social change.

Key tenets
Post-behavioralism challenged the idea that academic research had to be value neutral and argued that values should not be neglected.
Post-behavioralism claimed that behavioralism's bias towards observable and measurable phenomena meant that too much emphasis was being placed on easily studied trivial issues at the expense of more important topics.
Research should be more relevant to society and intellectuals have a positive role to play in society.

Criticism
Heinz Eulau described post-behavioralism as a "near hysterical response to political frustrations engendered by the disconcerting and shocking events of the late sixties and early seventies".

See also
Positivism

References

Further reading
Easton, David (1959) The New Revolution in Political Science, The American Political Science, 63/4: 1051-1061

Subfields of political science
Political theories